George Evelyn may refer to:

 George Evelyn (1617–1699), English politician, MP for Reigate, Haslemere, and Surrey
 George Evelyn (1641–1699), English politician, MP for Bletchingley and Gatton (UK Parliament constituency)
 George Evelyn (1678–1724), English politician, MP for Bletchingley (UK Parliament constituency)
 George Evelyn (1970-), English musician/DJ, known as Nightmares on Wax or DJ E.A.S.E